Pierre Montaz (7 May 1924 – 3 August 2021) was a French engineer and businessman. He was a pioneer in the field of cable transport and the founder of the ski lift company Montaz Mautino in 1952 alongside his associate Victor Mautino (it was renamed Gimar Montaz Mautino when the company merged with Gimar) . He also invented the detachable ski lift pole alongside .

Writings
Onze Américains tombés du ciel (1994)
Les pionniers du téléski (2006)

References

1924 births
2021 deaths
20th-century French engineers
20th-century French businesspeople
People from Levallois-Perret
20th-century French inventors